Eduard Novotný (born 2 April 1921) was a Czechoslovak bobsledder who competed in the late 1940s. At the 1948 Winter Olympics in St. Moritz, he finished 14th in both the two-man and four-man events.

References
 1948 bobsleigh two-man results
 1948 bobsleigh four-man results
 Eduard Novotný's profile at Sports Reference.com

External links
 

Olympic bobsledders of Czechoslovakia
Bobsledders at the 1948 Winter Olympics
Czechoslovak male bobsledders
Possibly living people
1921 births